M41, M-41, or M.41 may refer to:

Transportation 
 M-41 (Michigan highway), a former state highway in Michigan
 M41 (Cape Town), a Metropolitan Route in Cape Town, South Africa
 M41 (Johannesburg), a Metropolitan Route in Johannesburg, South Africa
 M41 (Durban), a Metropolitan Route near Durban, South Africa
 M41 motorway, a En motorway in England
 M41 highway, a major highway in Central Asia which crosses the Pamir Mountains
 BMW M41, a 1994 straight-4 diesel engine

Military 

 M41 Walker Bulldog, an American light tank
 M41 155 mm Howitzer Motor Carriage, developed from M24 Chaffee
 M1941 Johnson rifle
 M1941 Johnson Light Machine Gun
 Macchi M.41 and M.41bis, an Italian flying boat fighter of the 1930s
 Type 41 75 mm Mountain Gun, a Japanese artillery gun
 HMS Quorn (M41), a British naval minesweeper
 M41 Light Rifle/TLR-41, a possible designation for the Thompson Light Rifle
 M-1941 Field Jacket, a World War II-era US Army uniform jacket

Entertainment 
 M41A pulse rifle, a fictional assault rifle from the 1986 film Aliens and related media
 The 41st millennium, as expressed in the game Warhammer 40000.

Other 

Messier 41 (M41), an open star cluster in the constellation Canis Major
 M41, a postcode in the M postcode area that covers the town of Urmston, United Kingdom
 the 41st Mersenne prime